The Sawtooth Mountains are a mountain range of the Peninsular Ranges system, located in eastern San Diego County, California.

The Sawtooth Mountains are within the western Colorado Desert, southwest of Anza-Borrego Desert State Park and the Tierra Blanca Mountains. The Jacumba Mountains lie to the southeast.

The Sawtooth Mountains Wilderness is located within the range.

References 

Mountain ranges of the Colorado Desert
Mountain ranges of San Diego County, California
Peninsular Ranges